Barbara Jean Wiese (born 14 January 1950) is a former Australian politician. She was a Labor member of the South Australian Legislative Council from 1979 to 1995, when she resigned. She served on the front bench from 1985 to 1994, generally with the Tourism portfolio. She was the third woman and Labor's second elected to the Legislative Council.

See also
Women and government in Australia
Women in the South Australian Legislative Council

References

1950 births
Living people
Members of the South Australian Legislative Council
Place of birth missing (living people)
Australian Labor Party members of the Parliament of South Australia
Women members of the South Australian Legislative Council